Warren Lee Hill Jr. (June 28, 1960 – January 27, 2015) was a prisoner executed in Georgia in the United States. Hill was originally sentenced to life imprisonment for shooting and killing his girlfriend, Myra Wright, in 1985. He was subsequently sentenced to death for killing his cellmate, Joseph Handspike. In 1990, Hill killed Handspike in their cell by bludgeoning him to death with a wooden board studded with nails.

His execution by lethal injection, scheduled for July 15, 2013,  was postponed due to a legal challenge against Georgia's Lethal Injection Secrecy Act. This law, passed in March 2013, makes the identities of companies and individuals who make and supply lethal injection drugs, and the identities of the doctors hired by the state to oversee executions, a "state secret" that must be shielded from disclosure to the public, the media, and even the judiciary. Hill's lawyers argued that this would prevent Hill from knowing whether the execution would be carried out by competent personnel using properly formulated drugs. The secrecy regime was ultimately upheld by the Georgia Supreme Court.

There was also controversy as to whether or not Hill qualified as being mentally disabled, a designation that would have precluded him from being executed. On this basis of his mental capabilities the European Union had appealed several times to the Georgia Chairman of the Board of Pardons and Paroles and Georgia Governor Nathan Deal to prevent Hill from being executed. Hill was executed on January 27, 2015.

See also 
 Atkins v. Virginia
 List of people executed in Georgia (U.S. state)
 List of people executed in the United States in 2015

References 

1960 births
2015 deaths
21st-century executions by Georgia (U.S. state)
21st-century executions of American people
1985 murders in the United States
1990 murders in the United States
American people executed for murder
Executed African-American people
People convicted of murder by Georgia (U.S. state)
People executed by Georgia (U.S. state) by lethal injection
Prisoners sentenced to life imprisonment by Georgia (U.S. state)
21st-century African-American people